Austrosynthemis is a monotypic genus of dragonfly in the family Synthemistidae.
Its single species, Austrosynthemis cyanitincta, 
more commonly known as the turquoise tigertail,
is found in south-western Australia,
where it inhabits streams.

The species Austrosynthemis cyanitincta is a small, black dragonfly with blue markings.

Gallery

References

Synthemistidae
Anisoptera genera
Monotypic Odonata genera
Insects of Australia
Endemic fauna of Australia
Taxa named by Frank Louis Carle
Insects described in 1995